The Namibian Tri-Nations tournament is the second edition of the Tier 3 African tournament that coincides with the 2013 end-of-year rugby union tests. With 2012 Champions Spain touring South America in the 2013 end-of-year international window, Kenya will join hosts Namibia and Zimbabwe over the 3 match days.

The tournament will return to the Hage Geingob Rugby Stadium in Windhoek over 3 match days with in a period of a week, 8 November - 16 November. Coincidentally, the three teams competing will all compete in the 2014 Africa Cup Division 1A tournament along with Madagascar who is competing in the Serendib International Cup.

Table

Matches

Namibia v Zimbabwe

Kenya v Zimbabwe

Namibia v Kenya

See also
 2013 end-of-year rugby union tests
 2013 mid-year rugby union tests
 2013 Africa Cup
 Serendib International Cup

References

2013 in African rugby union
2013 rugby union tournaments for national teams
rugby union
rugby union
rugby union
rugby union